Sri Kantha Krishnamacharyulu or Krishnamayya (12th-13th century CE) was the official songmaster, poet and bard of the Simhachalam Temple, in Visakhapatnam, Andhra Pradesh, and a Telugu composer who composed around 400,000 keertana songs, in praise of Sri Varahalakshmi Narasimha Swamy, the presiding deity of the temple. He was contemporary to the Kakatiya king, Orugallu. There is a mention about Krishnamaacharyulu, his compositions and his miraculous life in Prataaapa rudra charitraand siddheswara charitra
 
Currently, Annamacharya of the 15th century is regarded as first vaggeyakara in Telugu. But, that position belongs to Krishnamayya, as he lived 300 years prior to Annamacharya. Musicologists and scholars believe that Krishnayya’s writings bore an indelible influence on later poet-composers. For instance, the song, ‘Ye Kulajudaina Nemi’ was inspired by Krishnamayya. His compositions were rendered in simple prose format but encased the highest Vaishanavism. There is no linguistic ornamentation, so to say. He is venerated as the father of sankeertana by the later saint-poets of Telugu language. He was supposed to have carried his four lakh vachanams (prosody) on copper plates when he went on a pilgrimage. Of these, only 200 have been retrieved so far and are in existence as of now. They are full of devotional fervour and have been collected in a book form and set to tunes by vinukondaMurali krishna, a musician and a musicologist of Visakhapatnam(Source: Music MS works in Saraswatimahal, Tanjore Library and Madras MSS Govt. Library)(manuscripts), Mss manu Scripts `Prataapa Rudreeyam')

1.`Toli telugu vaaggeyakaarudu Sreekanta Krishnamaachaaryulu' a news item by V. Murali Mohan, Cultural correspondent  published in `Andhraprabha' Telugu daily (Vizianagram edition) dt.05.12.1986((Source: Music MS works in Saraswatimahal, Tanjore Library and Madras MSS Govt. Library)(manuscripts), Mss manu Scripts `Prataapa Rudreeyam')
2.`Srikanta krishnamaachaaryulu'(12th-13th centuries) an excerpt from the article The unknown composers of South India
contributed by Sri. V. Murali Mohan, Cultural Correspondent, published in The Indian Express, Vizianagram edition dt 02.12.1986 (Source ; Manuscripts Music MS works in Saraswatimahal, Tanjore Library and Madras MSS Govt. Library), Mss manu Scripts `Prataapa Rudreeyam')
3Velugulo annamayya-cheekatlo Krishnamayya'a news item article published in Vaartha, Telugu daily

Compositions
There are a few detractors who do refuse to categorise Krishnamaacharya under the ‘Vaggeyakara’ as his compositions were prosody (vachanam/gadyam) but the fact that there is ample testimony to state that he sang them tunefully at the temple and to this day, a few lines from his vachanam are still rendered musically as part and parcel of the regular ritualistic puja at the temple of Simhachala goes without saying that he was indeed a composer.

iThe Simhagiri Vachanams, restricted to libraries until now, were brought into light after a long and through research from the sources ;Music MS works in Saraswatimahal, Tanjore Library and Madras MSS Govt. Library)(manuscripts), Mss manu Scripts `Prataapa Rudreeyam') and translated to Keerthans by Sri. Vinukomnda Murali Mohan, a noted Musician of Vizag, so it would be easier for everyone to remember and render. The Keertans of Krishnamayya were composed in three different styles i.e. traditional padhyams, keerthans and in a special style fusing modern trend to suit the tastes of all generations.

Krishnamayya project
Sri. SriKantha Krishnamacharyulu, also known as Krishnamayya, was a renowned devotee and poet belonging to the 12th- 13th century. It was believed that he composed over four hundred thousand vachanas in praise of Lord Sri. Varaha Lakshmi Narasimha. Only 200 are known to have survived to this day. His Simhagiri Vachanas are still recited in Simhachalam in Vizag. His works were perhaps available to Annamayya. He wrote poetry in simple, non-metrical language that was free from any ornamentation or high vocabulary that distracts the attention from the essential philosophy of his writings. Krishnamayya was also a converted Vaishnavite. It was without any doubt that Annamacharya was highly influenced by Krishnamacharya as his name was also mentioned in one of his works. The Krishnamayya foundation of Visakhapatnam had launched a project, on 4 July 2009, in the name of Saint Krishnamayya viz. "Krishnamayya project" under the Chairmanship of the Hon. H. H. Dr. P Ananda Gajapathi Raju former Education Minister of A.P and the hereditary trustee of Sri Varaha lakshmi Narasimha Swamy vari Devastanam. With a mission to popularise the life and works of Srikantha Krishnamaachaaryulu, a project was launched  by Dr. Pusapaati Ananada Gajapathi Raju, the hereditary trustee of Simhachalam Devasthanam on 4 July 2009 Krishnamayya project is the brain child of Sri. Vinukonda Murali Mohan, S/O Jogarao Sri. Murali Mohan is the creator and author of Krishnamayya Project

References

External links
 http://krishnamayyaproject.blogspot.in/: 
 http://tolisankeertanacharyudukrishnamayya.blogspot.com/2012/02/blog-post.html

Carnatic musicians
Performers of Hindu music
Hindu poets
Telugu poets
History of Andhra Pradesh
Musicians from Visakhapatnam
Indian male poets
Indian male classical musicians
12th-century Indian poets
13th-century Indian poets
12th-century Indian musicians
13th-century Indian musicians